The Council elections held for Wolverhampton City Council on 10 June 2004 were "all out", meaning all 60 seats (3 seats in each of the 20 wards) were up for election.

The composition of the council following the election was:

Labour 41
Conservative 16
Liberal Democrat 3

In each ward, 3 Councillors were elected.  The candidate with the most votes was elected to serve a 4-year term, the candidate with the second highest number of votes was elected to serve a 3-year term and the candidate who finished third was elected to serve 2 years as a Councillor.

As there were no elections with a tied number of votes, all of the results from 10 June 2004 have followed, or will follow, the rule stated above.

Election result

The candidate with the most votes polled who finished (1st) was elected for a term of 4 years.

The candidate who finished (2nd) was elected for a term of 3 years.

The candidate who finished (3rd) was elected for a term of 2 years.

As all 20 wards in Wolverhampton had to elect 3 councillors, this rule applied to all wards without exception.

External links
Local Election Results for May 2004

2004
2000s in the West Midlands (county)
2004 English local elections